Typhonia expressa is a moth of the family Psychidae first described by Edward Meyrick in 1916. It is found in Sri Lanka.

References

Moths of Asia
Moths described in 1916
Psychidae